The 2006-07 Minnesota Timberwolves season was the team's 18th in the NBA. They began the season hoping to improve upon their 33-49 output from the previous season. However, they came one win shy of tying it, finishing 32-50.

It was Kevin Garnett's final season of his first stint with the Timberwolves as he was traded to the Boston Celtics following the season. He would eventually win a championship with the Celtics in 2008. Garnett returned to Minnesota midway in the 2014-15 season for his second stint. Also following the season, tragedy struck as Eddie Griffin died in an automobile accident on August 17, 2007.

Draft picks

Regular season

Season standings

Record vs. opponents

Game log

Roster

Roster Notes
 Forward Eddie Griffin died in a car accident on August 17.

Player statistics

Regular season 

|-
| 
| style=";"| 82 || style=";"| 81 || 31.0 || .509 || .290 || .754 || 6.2 || .8 || .5 || .7 || 12.3
|-
| 
| 81 || style=";"| 81 || 37.3 || .465 || style=";"| .397 || .839 || 3.9 || style=";"| 4.8 || 1.0 || .3 || 17.0
|-
| 
| style=";"| 82 || 12 || 22.9 || .434 || .368 || .854 || 2.7 || 2.8 || .6 || .3 || 10.1
|-
| 
| 76 || 76 || style=";"| 39.4 || .476 || .214 || .835 || style=";"| 12.8 || 4.1 || style=";"| 1.2 || style=";"| 1.7 || style=";"| 22.4
|-
| 
| 13 || 0 || 7.1 || .259 || .000 || .800 || 1.9 || .3 || .0 || .5 || 1.4
|-
| 
| 76 || 68 || 29.3 || .490 || .240 || .783 || 3.2 || 2.7 || .3 || .3 || 6.7
|-
| 
| 34 || 6 || 16.3 || .379 || .350 || .813 || 1.4 || 2.1 || .4 || .1 || 5.9
|-
| 
| style=";"| 82 || 65 || 25.2 || .422 || .372 || .837 || 2.0 || 3.6 || .7 || .1 || 10.1
|-
| 
| 70 || 13 || 22.2 || .418 || .376 || .761 || 2.6 || 2.1 || 1.1 || .2 || 5.3
|-
| 
| 56 || 0 || 8.4 || style=";"| .535 || . || .517 || 1.6 || .2 || .2 || .2 || 1.1
|-
| 
| 37 || 0 || 15.0 || .350 || .267 || .690 || 1.3 || 1.0 || .7 || .2 || 5.0
|-
| 
| 41 || 3 || 7.8 || .374 || . || style=";"| .867 || 1.1 || .4 || .1 || .1 || 2.6
|-
| 
| style=";"| 82 || 5 || 18.7 || .531 || .000 || .624 || 5.1 || .6 || .6 || .2 || 7.4
|-
| 
| 19 || 0 || 10.0 || .400 || .300 || .722 || 1.1 || .8 || .5 || .1 || 3.5
|}

Awards and records
 Kevin Garnett, All-NBA Second Team
 Kevin Garnett, NBA All-Defensive Second Team
 Randy Foye, NBA All-Rookie Team 1st Team
 Craig Smith, NBA All-Rookie Team 2nd Team

Transactions

References

Minnesota Timberwolves seasons
2006 in sports in Minnesota
2007 in sports in Minnesota
Monnesota